Effective is the debut album by R&B group Side Effect. Released in 1973, this was the group's first and only album for Canadian-based GAS Records.

It was reissued on CD in 2001 on Soul Brother Records.

Track listing
Listen to the Beat of the Drum - (Lometta Johnson, McNeil)  3:19
Run Run Run - (Lometta Johnson, Jim Gilstrap)  2:17
Spend It on Love - (Lometta Johnson, McNeil)  3:20
Do Your Thing - (Jim Gilstrap)  4:52
Unless You're Wearing Your Emotions - (Jim Gilstrap)  3:07
Do You Believe - (Jim Gilstrap)  3:51
Tree of Love - (Jim Gilstrap)  3:19
Jim's Wrapp - (Jim Gilstrap)  4:28
Sylvia - (Jim Gilstrap, Augie Johnson)  4:12
Wash Your Troubles Away - (Allen)  4:09

External links
Side Effect-Effective at All Music

References

1973 debut albums
Side Effect albums